Bob Hampton of Placer is a 1921 American silent drama film directed by Marshall Neilan and written by Marion Fairfax. It is based on the 1910 novel Bob Hampton of Placer by Randall Parrish. The film stars James Kirkwood Sr., Wesley Barry, Marjorie Daw, Pat O'Malley, Noah Beery Sr., and Frank Leigh. The film was released on May 1, 1921, by Associated First National Pictures.

Cast      
James Kirkwood Sr. as Bob Hampton
Wesley Barry as Dick
Marjorie Daw as The Kid
Pat O'Malley as Lt. Brant
Noah Beery Sr. as Red Slavin
Frank Leigh as Silent Murphy
T. D. Crittenden as Gen. Custer
Tom Gallery as Rev. Wyncoop
Priscilla Bonner as Schoolteacher
Charles West as Maj. Brant
Bert Sprotte as Sheriff
Carrie Clark Ward as Housekeeper
Victor Potel as Willie McNeil 
Charles A. Post as Jack Moffet

References

External links

 

1921 films
1920s English-language films
Silent American drama films
1921 drama films
First National Pictures films
Films directed by Marshall Neilan
American silent feature films
American black-and-white films
Films based on American novels
1920s American films